Maris Estelle King (1922–1997) was an Australian public servant and diplomat.

King began her Commonwealth Public Service career in 1942 as a typist in the Department of External Affairs. In 1943, King was posted to Chongqing, China. She was the first clerical officer that the Australian Government had sent abroad. From 1951 to 1954, whilst still an external affairs officer, King studied Arts at the Canberra University College. She performed consistently well in her exams, including topping the Melbourne University examination class list in economics from 1952 to 1954.

King went on to become the third woman to head an Australian diplomatic mission, as Australian High Commissioner to Nauru from 1977 to 1979. In 1980 she was appointed Australia's first resident High Commissioner to Tonga. She arrived in May 1980, and was living in Nuku'alofa when Cyclone Isaac ravaged Tonga. No Australians were killed or injured in the storms.

King retired in 1984.

Honours
In 2010, a street in Casey, Australian Capital Territory was named Maris King Street in King's honour. In late 2016, the Department of Foreign Affairs and Trade named one of its 16 meeting rooms in honour of King, in recognition of her work as a pioneering female diplomat.

References

1922 births
1997 deaths
High Commissioners of Australia to Kiribati
High Commissioners of Australia to Nauru
High Commissioners of Australia to Tonga
Australian women ambassadors
Australian expatriates in China